Bombax ceiba, like other trees of the genus Bombax, is commonly known as cotton tree. More specifically, it is sometimes known as Malabar silk-cotton tree; red silk-cotton; red cotton tree; or ambiguously as silk-cotton or kapok, both of which may also refer to Ceiba pentandra.

This Asian tropical tree has a straight tall trunk and its leaves are deciduous in winter.  Red flowers with 5 petals appear in the spring before the new foliage.  It produces a capsule which, when ripe, contains white fibres like cotton.  Its trunk bears spikes to deter attacks by animals.  Although its stout trunk suggests that it is useful for timber, its wood is too soft to be very useful.

Description
Bombax ceiba grows to an average of 20 meters, with old trees up to 60 meters in wet tropical regions. The trunk and limb bear numerous conical spines particularly when young, but get eroded when older.

Staminal tube is short, more than 60 in 5 bundles. Seeds are numerous, long, ovoid, black or gray in colour and packed in white cotton.

Gallery

Cultivation
The tree is widely planted in southeastern Asian countries and regions (such as in Myanmar, Thailand, Vietnam, Malaysia, Philippines, Indonesia, southern China and Taiwan, etc.) According to Chinese historical record, the king of Nam Yuet (located in the southern China and northern Vietnam nowadays), Zhao Tuo, gave a tree to the emperor of the Han dynasty in the 2nd century BC.

This tree is commonly known as Let-pan (Burmese language: လက်ပံ), semal, shimul or ximolu (Assamese: শিমলু) in India.  It is widely planted in parks and on roadsides there because of its beautiful red flowers which bloom in March/April. This tree is quite common in New Delhi although it doesn't reach its full size of 60m there because of the semi arid climate. The cotton fibers of this tree can be seen floating in the wind around the time of early May. This tree shows two marked growth sprints in India: in spring and during the monsoon months. Perhaps due to subtropical climate and heavy rainfalls, it is found in dense populations throughout the Northeast India. In Myanmar, its flowers are let to be dry and cooked, which is one of the traditional foods of Myanmar.

This tree is also found in the eastern parts of Pakistan, especially in the eastern city of Lahore. The local Urdu and Punjabi names for the tree is sumbal, semal, sainbhal.

The 1889 book 'The Useful Native Plants of Australia records that the tree was at that time known as Bombax malabaricum, and its common names included 'Simool Tree;or 'Malabar Silk-cotton Tree of India' and that the calyx of the flower-bud is eaten as a vegetable in India."

Uses
The white fluffy fibres are carded into thread and woven into textiles in Nepal and India. In North India, the fibers are also used in pillows. In Thailand, the dry cores of the Bombax ceiba flower  are an essential ingredient of the nam ngiao spicy noodle soup of the cuisine of Shan State and Northern Thailand, as well as the kaeng khae curry.
Its flower buds known as "Marathi Moggu" are also used in regional cuisine of Southern India as a spice as well as in herbal medicine.

Role in Cantonese culture

Bombax ceiba is literally known as “cotton-tree flowers” in Cantonese. It plays a vital role in Southern Chinese, especially Guangzhou Cantonese culture. It is the official flower of Guangzhou, the capital of Guangdong Province in southern China. With some trees flowering from late February to early May. Fruiting can start as early as March. At the peak of its flowering season, elderly people may often be seen gathering the fallen flowers from the ground to dry, which they later use to prepare tea or soup. The flowers are very attractive to local wildlife, with many birds like the Japanese white-eye, a type of fruit eating bird, which often draws a hole in an unopened Bombax ceiba flower bud. Honey bees, and bumble bees also attracted to the flowers to collect pollen and nectar. Because the flowers attract many insects, crab spiders can be occasionally found on a fully opened flower, hunting bees.

The flower was also used as the trademark of the Guangzhou-based China Southern Airlines

References

External links

 Pandanus database of Indian plant names
 Birds on Silk Cotton - A Photo Essay

ceiba
Flora of tropical Asia
Plants described in 1753
Taxa named by Carl Linnaeus
Cantonese culture
Regional symbols of Guangdong